Parasiccia perirrorata is a moth of the subfamily Arctiinae. It was described by George Hampson in 1903. It is found in China.

References

Lithosiini
Moths described in 1903